Andrew Durham (born 19 November 1982) is a Zimbabwean cricketer. He played one first-class match for Mashonaland A in 2001/02. He was also part of Zimbabwe's squad for the 2002 Under-19 Cricket World Cup.

References

External links
 

1982 births
Living people
Zimbabwean cricketers
Mashonaland A cricketers
Cricketers from Cape Town